The Europe Zone was one of the two regional zones of the 1931 International Lawn Tennis Challenge.

22 teams entered the Europe Zone, with the winner going on to compete in the Inter-Zonal Final against the winner of the America Zone. Great Britain defeated Czechoslovakia in the final, and went on to face the United States in the Inter-Zonal Final.

Draw

First round

Great Britain vs. Monaco

Germany vs. South Africa

Switzerland vs. Ireland

Greece vs. Austria

Czechoslovakia vs. Spain

Hungary vs. Italy

Second round

Finland vs. Egypt

Yugoslavia vs. Japan

Belgium vs. Great Britain

Ireland vs. South Africa

Greece vs. Czechoslovakia

Italy vs. Netherlands

Norway vs. Poland

Denmark vs. Romania

Quarterfinals

Japan vs. Egypt

Great Britain vs. South Africa

Czechoslovakia vs. Italy

Denmark vs. Poland

Semifinals

Great Britain vs. Japan

Denmark vs. Czechoslovakia

Final

Czechoslovakia vs. Great Britain

References

External links
Davis Cup official website

Davis Cup Europe/Africa Zone
Europe Zone
International Lawn Tennis Challenge